Torulaspora is a genus of ascomycetous yeasts in the family Saccharomycetaceae.

See also
Yeast in winemaking

References

External links

Saccharomycetaceae
Yeasts
Yeasts used in brewing
Ascomycota genera